Towarzystwo Hokejowe Unia Oświęcim is a Polish ice hockey club based in Oświęcim, Poland. They currently play in the Polska Hokej Liga, the top-level ice hockey league in Poland. The team's colors are blue and white.

History
The club was created in 1946, with the hockey section being created in 1958. From 1958 to 1999 it was called KS Unia Oświęcim, and from 1999 to 2006, Dwory Unia Oświęcim. Their home ice is the Hala Lodowa MOSiR which can holds 3,500 people.

In June 2020, Jewish Israeli-Canadian and Team Israel captain Eliezer Sherbatov signed a one-year contract with the team, which plays just a short walk from the site of the Auschwitz concentration camp, where one million Jews were killed by the Nazis during the Holocaust.  Sherbatov said, "I have a great deal of motivation because it is Auschwitz. I want to win the championship, the Polish Cup and the continental title, and then everyone will know the one who did this is a Jewish-Israeli." His father told him: "to work hard, to show his lion’s heart, and to be proud of Israel and show people we are still alive."

Players
  Eliezer Sherbatov
  Sebastian Lipinski
  Clarke Saunders
  Peter Bezuska
  Patrik Luza
  Patryk Noworyta
  Klemen Pretnar
  Jakub Saur
  Jakub Wanacki
  Miroslav Zatko
  Luka Kalan
  Gregor Klobar
  Sebastian Kowalowka
  Lukasz Krzemien
  Patryk Malicki
  Damian Piotrowicz
  Anatoli Protasenya
  Martin Przygodzki
  Andrej Themar
  Alexei Trandin
  Dariusz Wanat

Achievements 

Polish Championship:
Winners (8) : 1992, 1998, 1999, 2000, 2001, 2002, 2003, 2004
2nd Place (8) : 1991, 1993, 1994, 1995, 1996, 1997, 2005, 2020, 2022
3rd Place (2) : 2011, 2012
Polish Cup (Ice Hockey):
Winners (2) : 2000, 2003

Season-by-season

References

External links 
  (in Polish)

Ice hockey teams in Poland
Sport in Lesser Poland Voivodeship
Sport in Oświęcim